Christopher Ashley (born July 6, 1964) is an American stage director. Since 2007, he has been the artistic director of the La Jolla Playhouse.

Career
Ashley graduated from Yale University in 1986, with a Bachelor of Art in Theatre. In 1987, he completed The Drama League program for directors.  He was appointed artistic director of the La Jolla Playhouse, California, in 2007.

Ashley directed the musical Memphis, which opened on Broadway in October 2009, receiving the Outer Critics Circle Award nomination for Outstanding Director and Tony Award nomination, Best Direction of a Musical. He previously directed the musical version of the cult 1980 film Xanadu (2007) on Broadway, receiving a Drama Desk Award nomination, for direction, as well as several other plays and musicals.

He has directed many stage works Off-Broadway, including at the Manhattan Theatre Club. He directed Jeffrey by Paul Rudnick Off-Broadway at the WPA Theatre in 1993, for which he received the Lucille Lortel Award, Outstanding Director. He also directed the film version, which was released in 1995.

He directed the Sondheim Kennedy Center Celebration productions of Sweeney Todd and Merrily We Roll Along in 2002.

He directed the new musical Come from Away, which premiered at the La Jolla Playhouse in June 2015, and opened on Broadway in February 2017 at the Gerald Schoenfeld Theatre, receiving a Tony Award for Best Direction of a Musical. He was originally set to direct a film adaptation of the musical, which was canceled on February 2, 2021, because of the COVID-19 pandemic. Instead, he directed a live stage film recording of the show at the Schoenfeld Theatre in front of an invited audience including survivors and first responders from the 9/11 attacks, which was released on Apple TV+ on September 10, 2021, to coincide with the 20th anniversary of the attacks.

He directed the new musical stage version of Freaky Friday, which premiered at the Signature Theatre, Arlington, Virginia in October 2016.

The 2021 film musical Diana, directed by Ashley, was released on Netflix on October 1, 2021.

Personal life
Ashley is openly gay.

Work
Broadway
Diana (2021) 
Escape to Margaritaville (2018)
Come from Away (2017) Tony Award, Best Direction of a Musical
Leap of Faith (2012)
Memphis (2009)
Xanadu  (2007)
The 24 Hour Plays (2005) (Special Benefit): That Other Person"
All Shook Up  (2005)
The Smell of the Kill (2002)
The Rocky Horror Show (2000) (Revival) Tony Award nomination, Direction of a Musical
Voices in the Dark (1999)
Jackie (1997) (Production consultant)

Off-Broadway (select)
Blown Sideways Through Life written by Claudia Shear (1993 and 1994), also TV film (1995)
Jeffrey (1992 and 1993), also the film (1995)
Fires in the Mirror: Crown Heights, Brooklyn and Other Identities, written by Anna Deavere Smith (1992) Lucille Lortel Award, Outstanding Director
The Most Fabulous Story Ever Told (1998)
Communicating Doors, written by Alan Ayckbourn (1998)
Valhalla (2004), written by Paul Rudnick; Lucille Lortel Award nomination, Outstanding Director

Regional
Escape to Margaritaville, La Jolla Playhouse (2017)
Freaky Friday, Signature Theatre (2016)
 Come from Away, La Jolla Playhouse (2015)

References

External links

Internet Off-Broadway Database

1964 births
Living people
Place of birth missing (living people)
American theatre directors
Tony Award winners
LGBT theatre directors
Yale College alumni
21st-century American LGBT people
American artistic directors